Military oath in the Finnish Defence Forces is taken by conscripts on a legal basis in the beginning of their military service. If the conscript is unwilling to take the oath, another option is to take the military affirmation. Before the conscript is to take the oath, he must be briefed on the rights and responsibilities of a soldier, as well as on the meaning of the oath. The oath is administered by the unit's commanding officer and in the presence of the unit's flag. The military oath used to be available only to members of the church, however, current legislation no longer makes such a distinction.

Usually the military oath is taken after the basic training period or about seven weeks into the conscript's military service. Depending on the circumstances, the oath ceremony is held either at the garrison or at a nearby municipality. The aim is to make the event as ceremonious as possible. The relatives of the conscript's are usually invited to attend the ceremony. The ceremony also includes a parade, field service, equipment demonstration and lunch. After taking the oath, the conscripts receive the rank of private. The military affirmation is usually taken on the same day in a smaller ceremony. The conscripts who take the assurance usually still participate in the oath ceremony, but do not take the oath itself.

Oath and affirmation text

Finnish text

English translation
I, (name), promise and affirm before the almighty and all-knowing God (in affirmation: by my honor and by my conscience),
that I am a trustworthy and faithful citizen of the realm of Finland. I want to serve my country honestly and, to my best ability, seek and pursue her edification and advantage.
I want everywhere and in every situation, during the peace and during the war, defend the inviolability of my fatherland, her legal system of government and the legal authority of the realm. If I perceive or gain knowledge of activity to overthrow the legal authority or to subvert the system of government of the country, I want to report it to the authorities without delay.
The troop to which I belong and my place in it I will not desert in any situation, but so long as I have strength in me, I will completely fulfill the task I have received.
I promise to act properly and uprightly, obey my superiors, comply with the laws and decrees and keep the service secrets trusted in me. I want to be forthright and helpful to my fellow servicemen. Never will I due to kinship, friendship, envy, hatred or fear nor because of gifts or any other reason act contrary to my duty in service. If I be given a position of superiority, I want to be rightful to my subordinates, to take care of their well-being, acquire information on their wishes, to be their councilor and guide and, for my own self, set them a good and encouraging example. 
All this I want to fulfill according to my honor and my conscience.

See also
United States Armed Forces oath of enlistment
Ceremonial oath of the Bundeswehr

References

Military of Finland
Oaths
Military oaths